Pampliega is a municipality and town located in the province of Burgos, Castile and León, Spain. According to the 2005 census (INE), the municipality had a population of 395 inhabitants.

References 

Municipalities in the Province of Burgos